Snake handling may refer to:

Snake handler, a person who professionally handles snakes
Snake handling in Christianity, the religious practice involving handling snakes